Lakeside Golf Course may refer to:

Canada
 Deerhurst Lakeside Golf Course, a golf course in Huntsville, Ontario
 Lakeside Golf Club, golf course in West Guilford, Ontario
 Lakeside Golf Resort, a golf course in Dundurn, Saskatchewan

United States
 Lakeside Golf Club, in Blackhawk, California
 Lakeside Golf Club, in Toluca Lake, Los Angeles
 Lakeside Golf Course (Oklahoma), in Stillwater, Oklahoma

See also 
 Lakeside (disambiguation)
 Lakeside Country Club (disambiguation)